The , abbreviated to DMO, is a type of JMA  and a part of its . There are five District Meteorological Observatories in Japan. They're responsible for regional observation of the atmosphere, earthquakes, volcanos and gathering up data on them in order to announcing information to the public that provides against various natural disasters. They also supervise  and other weather stations within each district area.

District Meteorological Observatories in Japan 

Covering area: Hokkaido

Covering area: Tōhoku region

Covering area: Kantō and Chūbu region

Covering area: Kinki, Chūgoku (except for Yamaguchi Prefecture) and Shikoku region

Covering area: Yamaguchi Prefecture and Kyushu region except for Okinawa Prefecture

In addition to the above weather observatories,  is considered to be equivalent to them in a status owing to the wideness of its district area, which is covering largely in the ocean.

Japan Meteorological Agency